Pou Senchey is an administrative district (khan) of Phnom Penh, Cambodia.

Phnom Penh International Airport is in Pou Senchey District.

Administration 
Khan Pou Senchey was established in 2011 by taking the following 13 Sangkats from Khan Dangkao: Trapeang Krasang, Kouk Roka, Phleung Chheh Roteh, Chaom Chau, Kakab, Samraong Kraom, Krang Thnong, Boeng Thum, Kamboul, Kantaok, Ovlaok, Ponsang and Snaor.

In 2013, Kouk Roka and Ponsang formed a part of a new entity, Khan Prek Pnov, while Krang Thnong was moved to Khan Sen Sok. In 2016, Chaom Chau was split in three separate Sangkats and Kakab was split in two parts.

On 8 January 2019, according to sub-decree 04 អនក្រ.បក, 6 Sangkats from Khan Pou Senchey were moved to a new khan, Khan Kamboul; the Sangkats involved were Kamboul, Kantaok, Ovlaok, Snaor, Phleung Chheh Roteh and Boeng Thum.

As of 2020, Pou Senchey is subdivided into seven Sangkats (communes) and 75 Phums (villages).

References

Districts of Phnom Penh